Ercüment Kafkasyalı (born 13 September 1985) is a Turkish footballer who plays as a goalkeeper for Çankaya.

References

External links

1985 births
Footballers from Ankara
Living people
Turkish footballers
Association football goalkeepers
Hacettepe S.K. footballers
Gençlerbirliği S.K. footballers
İnegölspor footballers
Samsunspor footballers
Konyaspor footballers
Ankaraspor footballers
Kardemir Karabükspor footballers
Sakaryaspor footballers
Darıca Gençlerbirliği footballers
Kocaelispor footballers
Süper Lig players
TFF First League players
TFF Second League players
TFF Third League players